This is a list of Pittsburgh Panthers football seasons, national championships and quarterbacks. The Pittsburgh Panthers football team is the American football team of the University of Pittsburgh in Pittsburgh. The team competes in the NCAA Division I Football Bowl Subdivision.  The Panthers have been members of the Atlantic Coast Conference since 2013.  From 1991 to 2012 they were members of the Big East Conference.  Before 1991 they competed as an independent.

The Panthers began play in 1890. In total, the University officially recognizes nine national championships. The university bases its claim for the five national championships from 1929 to 1937 on a 1967 article by Dan Jenkins of Sports Illustrated. The NCAA's record book lists Pittsburgh as being selected for a national championship by "major selectors" in eleven different seasons. Research by College Football Data Warehouse (CFBDW) has found that Pitt was selected as a national champion in 16 different seasons by at least one out of 80 selectors of titles. Of these, CFBDW names six as national championship seasons for the University of Pittsburgh.

Season records

Legend 

Polls have been the most prominent form of championship selection since the inception of the AP Poll in 1936. The following systems have at one point in their history have named Pitt as a national champion or are still active today.  Retroactive designations are marked in italics.

National championships 

The University of Pittsburgh claims nine national championships for the Panthers football team: four that are mostly unanimous, (1916, 1918, 1937, and 1976) and five shared titles (1915, 1929, 1931, 1934, 1936). Parke Davis was the only major selector of four of the titles, including the 1934 selection attributed to him after his pre-season death. 

The University bases its claim for the first eight national championships on a 1967 article by Dan Jenkins of Sports Illustrated. These championships, together with its unanimous championship of 1976, are the basis for the university's claim of nine national championship seasons.

Furthermore, according to research conducted by the College Football Data Warehouse, in eight additional years at least one out of 80 selectors of national titles has declared Pitt as its national champion. Combined with the Sports Illustrated article, Pitt has been recognized as the national champion by at least one selector in 17 different seasons. According to the NCAA Division 1 Football Records Book, Pitt has been named a national champion by a "Major Selector" in 11 separate seasons.

Note: The table lists all known national championship selections for the University of Pittsburgh. The list of national championship selecting organizations choosing Pitt for any particular year is not necessarily comprehensive. For more information see College Football Data Warehouse Total National Championships. All selections for seasons before 1927 were made retrospectively, as were many later selections. Additional notations include the following:
Pitt: national championship selections are officially recognized by the University
NCAA: Selection as national champions by organizations designated as "Major Selectors" in the official NCAA football records book
CFBDW: Designation as "CFBDW Recognized National Champions" according to College Football Data Warehouse.

* NCAA-designated "major selector"

The following table summarizes the source and totals for Pitt's national championship seasons.

Quarterbacks
Pitt's season-by-season completion leaders at quarterback since 1974 are depicted in the following table. 

* Denotes setting of team single-season completion record

References

Lists of college football seasons

Pittsburgh Panthers football seasons